Taiko no Tatsujin: Drum 'n' Fun!, released in Asia as  is a rhythm game developed and published by Bandai Namco Entertainment. It was first released in Japan and other parts of Asia in July 2018, and in North America, Europe and Australia in November. The title's release marks the first release of a Taiko no Tatsujin game to Western audiences in over a decade.

Gameplay 
Similar to past entries in the series, music notes, represented by circular faces of the series' mascots, move across a timeline in the middle of the screen from right to left.  represent the face of the drum, while  represent the drum's rim. Successfully playing the correct note as each one reaches the end of the timeline builds up a "Soul Gauge". If the gauge reaches a certain point by the end of the song, the stage is cleared.

There are several control options for Drum n' Fun!. The most accurate and consistent option is a specific peripheral controller developed by Hori, in the shape of a drum, as well as non-electronic plastic "drumsticks". These drums are sold separately or in a bundle with the game. It's possible, however, to use a regular controller to play, through use of a buttons-only mode. One could also use the Nintendo Switch's native controllers, the Joy-Con, through a mechanic called "virtual drumsticks" that utilizes the advanced motion controls of the Joy-Con. This method is considered unreliable and best for casual gameplay.

Besides traditional gameplay for a maximum of two players, a multitude of multiplayer rhythm-based party games are present to further expand upon the concept for up to 4 players. Additional updates to the game further added a head-to-head competitive multiplayer mode for two players, as well as online head-to-head and tournament competitive multiplayer modes.

Tracklist 
Similar to previous games in the series, the tracklist is organized into seven categories. The game also features downloadable song packs which can be purchased through the Nintendo eShop. The game contains 300 songs (inclusive of all downloadable songs) as of July 2020.

Pop

Anime

Vocaloid

Variety

Classical

Game Music

Namco Original

Release 
Taiko Drum Master game was confirmed for Switch in Japan, revealing features such as motion control and HD rumble support for the game. The game was released in July 19, 2018. A licensed drum controller by HORI was later released.

Bandai Namco Entertainment Asia published the game in Southeast Asia, which comes with official English translation of the game, on August 9. The game arrived with Japanese voice-overs and Japanese, Chinese, and Korean text while the English text was made available via a free patch.

Bandai Namco Entertainment America published the Western release of the game alongside Taiko no Tatsujin: Drum Session! for the PlayStation 4. The Western features the identical tracklist as the Japanese/Asia version while adding more language options. The game was digital-only in US while a physical version was released alongside the HORI licensed drum controller in Europe. It was released on November 2.

Reception 

Heidi Kemps of Gamespot rated the game 7/10. She praised the simplicity and variety of control modes for the rhythm portion of the games, while also praising the inclusion of numerous rhythm-based mini-games for the party mode, which is compared favorably to the Rhythm Heaven series of games. However, she feels that the most of the control schemes are not always optimal and that the Japanese-oriented tracklist might be daunting for newcomers. Gavin Lane of Nintendo Life also scored the game 7/10, praising the touch controls of the game and the fun selection of party games, while criticizing the excess loading screens and lackluster motion controls which is described as "unworkable".

Chris Carter of Destructoid gave the game an 8/10, praising the wide variety of songs and the various difficulty level available that allows players of all skill levels to enjoy the game. He also praised the cute presentation and solid performance of the game in portable mode. Mitchell Parton of Nintendo World Report gave the game 8.5/10 and described the game as "polished, fun and incredibly weird at times". He criticized the English translation and the broken motion controls, but feels that the solid core gameplay and inclusion of party games makes this game enjoyable with just about anyone.

Sales 
Taiko no Tatsujin: Drum & Fun! sold 69,984 retail copies during its first week of release in Japan according to Media Create sales figures, which made it the best selling game of the week. This is also the best debut for the series to date. As of December 2018, the game has sold more than 260,000 retail copies in Japan.

By July 2020, the game had sold over 1 million copies worldwide.

Notes

References

External links 
 Taiko no Tatsujin: Nintendo Switch Version! Japanese official website 
 Taiko no Tatsujin: Drum 'n' Fun! North America official website
 Taiko no Tatsujin: Drum 'n' Fun! European official website
 Taiko no Tatsujin: Drum 'n' Fun! at Nintendo of America

2018 video games
Music video games
Nintendo Switch games
Nintendo Switch-only games
Video games developed in Japan
Bandai Namco games
Taiko no Tatsujin
Multiplayer and single-player video games